Dmitri Vladimirovich Trush (pronounced as Troosh; born 8 February 1973 in Voronezh) is a former Olympic gymnast who competed for Russia in the 1996 Olympic Games. He won gold medal in the team competition.

See also
List of Olympic male artistic gymnasts for Russia

External links
 
 

1973 births
Living people
Russian male artistic gymnasts
Gymnasts at the 1996 Summer Olympics
Olympic gymnasts of Russia
Olympic gold medalists for Russia
Sportspeople from Voronezh
Medalists at the World Artistic Gymnastics Championships
Olympic medalists in gymnastics
Medalists at the 1996 Summer Olympics
20th-century Russian people